Three ships of the United States Navy have been named Block Island, after Block Island Sound. 

, went into service in March 1943, and was sunk in May 1944.
, was commissioned in December 1944 and active in the closing months of the Pacific War, and periodically in use until 1954.

United States Navy ship names